"Jewish Princess" is a song by Frank Zappa, released on his 1979 album Sheik Yerbouti. The song is about a man looking for a "nasty little Jewish Princess" with "long phony nails", "a garlic aroma that could level Tacoma", "a Yemenite hole", "a hair-do that rinses", "a couple of sisters that can raise a few blisters", "titanic tits", and "sand-blasted zits".  It attracted attention from the Anti-Defamation League, to which Zappa denied an apology, arguing: "Unlike the unicorn, such creatures do exist—and deserve to be 'commemorated' with their own special opus". He said that the ADL's concerns were "as if to say there is no such thing as a Jewish Princess. Like I invented this?"

Biographer Barry Miles wrote that the ADL asked the Federal Communications Commission (FCC) to ban the record from being played on the air – a symbolic effort given that the song was not being played anyway. This led to the rumor that a legal action had been filed against Zappa, an accusation Zappa denied.

Zappa said that songs which offend people such as "Jewish Princess" are why Sheik Yerbouti became one of his best selling albums of all time. The song was rarely performed in concert. It was later included on his posthumous compilation Have I Offended Someone? (1997).

See also 

 Aroma of Tacoma (mentioned in the song)

References

External links
 "Jewish Princess" on Globalia.net

Frank Zappa songs
1979 songs
Songs written by Frank Zappa
Jewish comedy and humor
Song recordings produced by Frank Zappa
Ethnic humour
Race-related controversies in music
Satirical songs